Trimethyl phosphite is an organophosphorus compound with the formula P(OCH3)3, often abbreviated P(OMe)3.  It is a colorless liquid with a highly pungent odor.  It is the simplest phosphite ester and finds used as a ligand in organometallic chemistry and as a reagent in organic synthesis.   The molecule features a pyramidal phosphorus(III) center bound to three methoxy groups.

Synthesis
Trimethyl phosphite is in principle obtainable by methanolysis of phosphorus trichloride, say in the presence of a proton accepting base. This method suffers from numerous side reactions however.  The use of sodium methoxide is superior:

Reactions
Trimethyl phosphite is susceptible to oxidation to trimethyl phosphate:

It reacts with a catalytic amount of methyl iodide in the Arbuzov reaction to give dimethyl methylphosphonate:
P(OCH3)3 → CH3P(O)(OCH3)2

As a ligand, trimethyl phosphite has a smaller cone angle and better acceptor properties relative to trimethylphosphine. A representative derivative is the colorless tetrahedral complex Ni(P(OMe)3)4 (m.p. 108 °C). The tridentate ligand called the Kläui ligand is derived from trimethyl phosphite. The formation of this ligand illustrates the susceptibility of trimethyl phosphite (and metal complexes thereof) to the Arbuzov reaction.

Trimethyl phosphite is also used as a mild desulfurization reagent in organic synthesis, for example in the preparation of derivatives of tetrathiafulvalene.

Toxicity
The LD50 is 1600–2890 mg/kg (oral, rat).

References

External links
 WebBook page for C3H9PO3
 CDC - NIOSH Pocket Guide to Chemical Hazards

Organophosphites
Methyl esters
Foul-smelling chemicals